Cameron Bradley Medhurst (born 10 June 1965) is an Australian former competitive figure skater. He is an eight-time (1982, 1984–1990) Australian national champion. He represented Australia at the 1984 Winter Olympics, where he placed 19th; at the 1988 Winter Olympics, where he again placed 19th; and at the 1992 Winter Olympics, where he placed 16th.

After retiring from competition, Medhurst appeared in ice shows and became a coach and choreographer. He is now a full-time coach at the Medibank Icehouse, Melbourne.

Results

References

Australian male single skaters
Olympic figure skaters of Australia
Figure skaters at the 1992 Winter Olympics
Figure skaters at the 1988 Winter Olympics
Figure skaters at the 1984 Winter Olympics
1965 births
Living people
Sportspeople from Melbourne